Isla Roca Lobos is an island in the Gulf of California east of the Baja California Peninsula. The island is uninhabited and is part of San Felipe Municipality.

Biology
Isla Roca Lobos has two species of reptile, including Sauromalus varius (Piebald Chuckwalla) and Uta stansburiana (Common Side-blotched Lizard).

References

http://herpatlas.sdnhm.org/places/overview/isla-roca-lobos/99/1/

Islands of Baja California
Islands of the Gulf of California
Uninhabited islands of Mexico